The following is a list of the schools in Scotland that participated in the Schools of Ambition programme.

By unitary council area.

Aberdeen City
St Machar Academy

Aberdeenshire
Alford Academy
Fraserburgh Academy

Angus
Arbroath Academy
Brechin High School

Argyll & Bute
Islay High School
Rothesay Academy

Clackmannanshire
Alloa Academy
Alva Academy
Lornshill Academy

Dumfries and Galloway
Castle Douglas High School
Wallace Hall Academy

Dundee City
Braeview Academy

East Ayrshire
Doon Academy

East Dunbartonshire
St Ninian's High School

East Lothian
Dunbar Grammar School

East Renfrewshire
Barrhead High School

Edinburgh City
Gracemount High School
Queensferry High School

Falkirk
Braes High School

Fife
Kirkcaldy High School
Kirkland High School

Glasgow City
Castlemilk High School
Springburn Academy
St Margaret Mary's Secondary School
St Paul's High School

Highland Region
Charleston Academy
Inverness High School

Inverclyde
Port Glasgow High School
St Stephen's High School

Midlothian
Newbattle Community High School

Moray
Lossiemouth High School

North Ayrshire
Auchenharvie Academy

North Lanarkshire
Cardinal Newman High School
Kilsyth Academy
Taylor High School

Orkney
Kirkwall Grammar
North Walls Community
Pierowall Junior
Sanday Junior High School
Stromness Academy
Stronsay Junior High School

Perth and Kinross
Blairgowrie High School

Renfrewshire
Renfrew High School

Scottish Borders
Hawick High School

Shetland
Anderson High School

South Ayrshire
Carrick Academy

South Lanarkshire
Lanark Learning Community

Stirling
St Modan's RC High School

West Dunbartonshire
Our Lady & St Patrick's High School

West Lothian
Burnhouse School

Western Isles
The Nicholson Institute

Education in Scotland
Schools in Scotland

Scottish education-related lists